Rozo FC is a football club from Turks and Caicos. They play in the Turks and Caicos first division, the WIV Provo Premier League.

Achievements
WIV Provo Premier League:
Runners-up (1): 2013

References

Football clubs in the Turks and Caicos Islands